Souls in Turmoil (Italian: Anime in tumulto) is a 1942 Italian drama film directed by Giulio Del Torre and starring Gina Falckenberg, Carlo Tamberlani and Leda Gloria.

The film's sets were designed by the art director Salvo D'Angelo. It was shot at the Cinecittà Studios in Rome.

Cast
 Gina Falckenberg as Elena von Kreuser 
 Carlo Tamberlani as Il professore Alberto Ferrari 
 Leda Gloria as Anna 
 Teresa Franchini as Teresa, la governante 
 Sergio Tofano as Perego 
 Emilio Petacci as Giuseppe, il maggiordomo 
 Fedele Gentile as Il dottor Marini 
 Galeazzo Benti as Un amico di Elena 
 Aris Valeri as Arturo, L'autista

References

Bibliography 
 Goble, Alan. The Complete Index to Literary Sources in Film. Walter de Gruyter, 1999.

External links 
 

1942 films
Italian drama films
Italian black-and-white films
1942 drama films
1940s Italian-language films
Films directed by Giulio Del Torre
Films shot at Cinecittà Studios
1930s Italian films
1940s Italian films